Skene! Records was an American DIY punk rock record label founded in Connecticut in 1988 by Jeff Spiegel, then later based in Minneapolis, Minnesota. An early album release was Better Yet Connecticut Hardcore, featuring bands such as Bug Gulp, Fallback, Freedom of Choice, Forced Reality and Scooter X.

Spiegel also promoted local punk shows in central Connecticut.  The most infamous of which being "the greatest show that never happened", showcased at the New Britain VFW hall and featuring bands such as Big Gulp, Freedom of Choice, and Fallback.  Shortly after the show began, during Fallback's set, a fight broke out and the show was forcibly shut down by the New Britain Police department; some of the footage was caught on a video tape that seems to have been lost.

The label later released records from such bands as Green Day, Trenchmouth, Shades Apart, AWAKE!, The People's Court, Slap of Reality, Candy Machine, Bob Evans, Lifter Puller, Actionslacks, Everready, Fuel (not to be confused with the popular rock band), Angry Son, Go!, Phleg Camp, Jawbreaker, Crimpshrine, Dog Tired, The Deviators, Gneissmaker, Walt Mink, and others, and was considered a contemporary of No Idea Records, Very Small Records, and Lookout! Records.

The label existed at least until 1996, and is mentioned by Matt Diehl in My So-Called Punk (St Martin's Press, 2007) in terms of the relation between punk with a DIY ethic and contemporary "neo-punk" involved in the Warped Tour and large punk labels such as Epitaph Records.

Notes

References 

American record labels
Punk record labels
Record labels established in 1988
Record labels disestablished in 1996
American independent record labels
Independent record labels based in Minnesota